Mohite is a copper tin sulfide mineral with the chemical formula Cu2SnS3. It is colored greenish gray and leaves a gray streak. It is opaque and has metallic luster. Its crystal system is triclinic pedial. It is rated 4 on the Mohs Scale and has a specific gravity of 4.86.

Discovery and occurrence
Mohite was first described in 1982 for an occurrence in the Chatkal-Kuramin Mountains of eastern Uzbekistan. It was named after Günter Harald Moh (1929–1993), University of Heidelberg. It is of hydrothermal origin and occurs associated with tetrahedrite, famatinite, kuramite, mawsonite and emplectite in the type locality in Uzbekistan. It has also been reported from Salamanca Province, Spain; the Organullo Mining District of Salta Province, Argentina; and the Delamar Mountains of Lincoln County, Nevada, US.

References 

Copper minerals
Tin minerals
Sulfide minerals
Monoclinic minerals
Minerals in space group 9